Grant Township is a township in Linn County, Iowa.

History
Grant Township was organized in 1872.

References

Townships in Linn County, Iowa
Townships in Iowa
1872 establishments in Iowa
Populated places established in 1872